David John James Monroe (born April 14, 1941) is a Canadian prelate of the Roman Catholic Church. He was ordained Bishop of the Diocese of Kamloops on March 12, 2002, and served in that post until 2016. He was succeeded by Bishop Joseph Phuong Nguyen.

History 
David John James Monroe was born on April 14, 1941 in Vancouver, BC, where he was also raised and went to school. Monroe completed his secondary school education at St. Patrick's Secondary School.

Ordination 
Monroe attended Christ the King Seminary and was ordained on May 20, 1967, by James Carney at St. Anthony's Church.

Diocese of Kamloops 
On March 18, 2002, Monroe was installed as the Bishop of Kamloops.

References 

1941 births
Living people
21st-century Roman Catholic bishops in Canada
Roman Catholic bishops of Kamloops